Port City Makerspace is a makerspace in Portsmouth, New Hampshire. It has been running since 2012, when it was first founded by a group of three graduates from Green Mountain College.

Membership 
Membership at Port City Makerspace can either be a monthly membership or a pass for a day. There is no application to become a member. New members of the space do have to go through a "safety checkout" process before they are allowed to use some of the dangerous power tools.

Community participation 
Members and staff of Port City Makerspaces have contributed projects to the community around Portsmouth, including the Prescott Park Green Room, a mobile trailer for performers at the Prescott Park Arts Festival.

Media coverage 
 Featured on New Hampshire Chronicle - January 17th, 2013
 Feature about soldering class on the SparkFun Education Blog - February 12, 2015
 Secoast Online - January 14, 2014
 Union Leader - September 10, 2013

References 

Hackerspaces
Portsmouth, New Hampshire
Organizations based in New Hampshire